Welcome to My World may refer to:

Albums
 Welcome to My World (Dean Martin album), 1967
 Welcome to My World (Elvis Presley album), 1977
 Welcome to My World (Jonathan Fagerlund album), 2009
 Welcome to My World (Rosie Gaines album), 2000
 Welcome to My World, by Jah Wobble, 2010

Songs
 "Welcome to My World" (Jim Reeves song), 1964
 "Welcome to My World" (Iris song), 2012
 "Welcome to My World" (Mýa song), 2015
 "Welcome to My World", by Tina Arena from In Deep, 1997

Other
 Welcome to My World, a 2016 unaired TV series featuring Chloe Lukasiak

See also
 My World and Welcome to It, an American television sitcom